Eight ships of the Royal Navy have borne the name HMS Caroline:

  was a 3-gun gunvessel, formerly a barge, purchased in 1794. She was sold in 1802.
  was a 36-gun fifth rate launched in 1795 and broken up in 1815.
 HMS Caroline was a 14-gun brig, formerly the French ship Affronteur, that  captured in 1803 and that was probably broken up in 1807. Accounts differ as to whether she was commissioned or instead was a hired vessel serving the Royal Navy under contract.
  was a schooner that  captured from the French in 1809 and that was listed until 1814.
  was a sailing gunboat serving in New Zealand waters. She was purchased in 1859 and sold in 1863.
  was a  composite screw corvette launched in 1882. She was reassigned to harbour service in 1897 and then became a training ship and was renamed  in 1908. She was renamed Powerful III in 1913 and Impregnable IV in 1919. She was finally sold in 1929.
  is a  light cruiser launched in 1914 and decommissioned in 2011.

See also
 
 

Royal Navy ship names